Julius Kovazh (6 July 1930 – 2 December 2012) was an Austrian footballer. He played in one match for the Austria national football team in 1957.

References

External links
 

1930 births
2012 deaths
Austrian footballers
Austria international footballers
Place of birth missing
Association footballers not categorized by position